Heleanna melanomochla is a moth of the family Tortricidae. It is endemic to Taiwan.

The wingspan is 10–12 mm.

The larvae feed on the young leaves of Mangifera indica. They damage the mango by folding the apices and margins of the leaves longitudinally. Pupation takes place in the pupal case in a folded leaf.

External links
Eurasian Tortricidae

Olethreutinae